Sortovuodet 1994–2004 (2004) is a double compilation album by the Finnish rock group Absoluuttinen Nollapiste. The first disc consists of B-sides from singles and other rarities, while the second disc is a complete live rendition of the album Suljettu.

Track listing

Disc 1
 "Romanttinen komedia" (Tommi Liimatta, Aki Läkkölä) - 3:53
 "Toukokuun leikit" (Liimatta) - 3:53
 "Pelkkä Eugenius" (Lääkkölä, Aake Otsala, Tomi Krutsin, Janne Hast, Liimatta) - 6:11
 "Tasan viikko bileisiin (silmukka kiristyy)" (Lääkkölä, Otsala, Krutsin, Hast, Liimatta) - 5:39
 "050703" (Otsala) - 0:53
 "Ylioppilaat" (Liimatta, Lääkkölä) - 3:05
 "030303" (Lääkkölä, Otsala, Liimatta, Krutsin) - 4:08
 "Pyhä Nynny III" (alternate mix) (Liimatta, Lääkkölä, Otsala, Krutsin) - 5:21
 "20. elokuuta" (Liimatta) - 2:47
 "Kun tanssi on valmis" (Liimatta, Läkkölä) - 3:13
 "Hyönteisen kuolinnaamio" (Liimatta) - 3:01
 "Ei syttynyt, mies hymähtää" (Liimatta, Läkkölä) - 5:10
 "Yhteistä väliseinä" (Liimatta, Läkkölä) - 4:23
 "Raami" (Liimatta) - 2:42
 "Tekijän kuvittama" (Liimatta) - 2:23
 "Perheenjäsen määrittelee (kotoisia esineitä käyttötarkoituksen mukaan ja suorittaa käytäntöön viittaavia yläkäsitemääritelmiä)" (Liimatta) - 2:54
 "Kassi kauniita silmiä" (alternate mix) (Liimatta, Lääkkölä, Otsala, Krutsin) - 2:22
 "Kaikkein kaunein Joo Komia" (Liimatta, Lääkkölä, Otsala, Krutsin) - 3:13
 "MOVALNF" (Liimatta, Lääkkölä, Otsal, Krutsin) - 2:45
 "Suu lähti liikkuun niinku muut" (Liimatta, Lääkkölä, Otsala, Krutsin) - 2:39
 "YPEKE" (Liimatta, Lääkkölä, Otsala, Krutsin) - 2:45
 "Kaikki nukkuu pois" (Liimatta, Lääkkölä, Otsala, Krutsin) - 4:07

Disc 2
 "Kasvatus" (Liimatta, Läkkölä) - 3:10
 "Mihin" (Liimatta) - 4:16
 "Esinekeräilyn hitaus" (Liimatta) - 3:11
 "Täällä on joku" (Liimatta) - 3:53
 "Portaat" (Otsala) - 3:59
 "Kupit on kuin olisi häät" (Otsala, Liimatta, Lääkkölä) - 3:27
 "Joen silmille" (Liimatta) - 3:34
 "Sukututkimus lannistaa" (Liimatta) - 4:00
 "Joutomaa" (Otsala) - 3:25
 "Tungos on lavaste" (Liimatta) - 6:07
 "Suvannossa ylpeä ilme I" (Liimatta) - 5:33
 "Suvannossa ylpeä ilme II" (Liimatta) - 3:54
 "Suvannossa ylpeä ilme III" (Liimatta) - 3:48
 "Suvannossa ylpeä ilme IV" (Liimatta) - 3:11
 "Suvannossa ylpeä ilme V" (Liimatta) - 6:46
 "Kiilakivi" (Liimatta) - 3:11
 "Olen pahoillani" (Lääkkölä) 6:46

External links
  Album entry at band's official website

Absoluuttinen Nollapiste albums
2004 compilation albums